Muhammad Ali's Greatest Fight is a 2013 American television drama film about boxer Muhammad Ali's refusal to report for induction into the United States military during the Vietnam War, focusing on how the United States Supreme Court decided to rule in Ali's favor in the 1971 case of Clay v. United States. The film was directed by Stephen Frears, from a screenplay written by Shawn Slovo based on the 2000 book Muhammad Ali's Greatest Fight: Cassius Clay vs. the United States of America by Howard Bingham and Max Wallace. It premiered on HBO on October 5, 2013.

Cast
Christopher Plummer as Justice John Marshall Harlan II
Frank Langella as Chief Justice Warren E. Burger
Ed Begley Jr. as Justice Harry Blackmun
Peter Gerety as Justice William J. Brennan Jr.
Barry Levinson as Justice Potter Stewart
John Bedford Lloyd as Justice Byron White
Fritz Weaver as Justice Hugo Black  (Weaver was himself a conscientious objector during World War II)
Harris Yulin as Justice William O. Douglas
Danny Glover as Justice Thurgood Marshall
Benjamin Walker as Kevin Connolly
Pablo Schreiber as Covert Becker 
Ben Steinfeld as Sam Edelstein 
Dana Ivey as Mrs. Paige
Kathleen Chalfant as Ethel Harlan 
Lisa Joyce as Donna Connolly 
Peter McRobbie as Erwin Griswold
Damian Young as Ramsey Clark
Chuck Cooper as Chauncey Eskridge 
Bob Balaban as Lawyer
Drew Gehling as Marshall's Clerk

Reception
The film has a rating of 38% in Rotten Tomatoes.

Hank Stuever of The Washington Post commented that the film, focused as it was on the behind-the-scenes legal discussion of the Supreme Court's justices and law clerks, and depicting one of Harlan's law clerks (a character that was "a fictional composite of several clerks") as playing a central role in the court's decision to free Ali, was at times "too much like a substandard episode of The Paper Chase" and  "more Wikipedia entry than story, as characters speak to one another in long paragraphs of legal exposition".

The Post did have positive comments about the lead performances of Langella and Plummer. Christopher Howse of The Daily Telegraph said the film "was worth watching in the comfort of the home, but if it had been shown in a cinema, it would hardly have been worth stirring from the fireside for."

Mary McNamara of the Los Angeles Times also commented on the excellent performances of the cast, while concluding that "[t]he legal wrangling of eight old white men behind closed doors simply pales in comparison" to Ali's part of the story.

Ali is not portrayed by an actor in the film, but instead Frears made repeated use of actual television news clips of Ali boxing, giving interviews, and performing.  These clips of the actual Ali are mentioned in multiple reviews as among the best elements of the film.

See also
Supreme Court of the United States in fiction

References

External links
 

2013 television films
2013 films
2010s legal films
American legal films
American courtroom films
Films scored by George Fenton
Films based on non-fiction books
Films directed by Stephen Frears
HBO Films films
Films about Muhammad Ali
Television courtroom dramas
2010s American films